The recently active basaltic Kaikohe-Bay of Islands volcanic field in the Northland Region of New Zealand is associated geographically with an older region of extinct volcanism to its north the Wairakau Volcanic Centre, meaning eruptions in this region have occurred over the last 20 million years. All the cones older than 2 million years have eroded away, leaving plateaus from Ōkaihau to Kerikeri and north to Whangaroa from the old andesite/dacite stratovolcanoes of the Wairakau Volcanic Centre and the ten million year old or more recent volcanoes in field towards the south. In the southern part of the field, around 12 small basaltic scoria cones, and a rhyolite dome erupted in the last 500,000 years around Kaikohe. The field is considered dormant, rather than extinct.

Tectonics
The field is part of the eastern Northland volcanic belt which extends south to the Whangārei volcanic field near Whangarei and the south east volcanics of the Taurikura volcanic complex as found in the Hen of the Hen and Chicken Islands. In the north this belt extends towards the Three Kings Ridge. As such, a large number and types of volcanics are adjacent. It is arc related to the continent-backarc transform Vening Meimesz fault zone to the east of the present Northland land mass which is the eastern boundary of the Northland Allochthon in Zealandia.

List of volcanoes
The volcanoes in the southern part of the field include:
Kaikohe Hill
Maungaturoto
Pouerua
Putahi
Tarahi
Tauanui
Te Ahuahu
Te Puke – last erupted 1300 to 1800 years ago

References

Volcanism of New Zealand
Far North District
Landforms of the Northland Region
Bay of Islands
Volcanoes of the Northland Region